The 2014 Arimex ATP Challenger Trophy was a professional tennis tournament played on clay courts. It was the eighth edition of the tournament which was part of the 2014 ATP Challenger Tour. It took place at the TC EMPIRE in Trnava, Slovakia from 15 to 21 September 2014.

Singles main-draw entrants

Seeds

Other entrants
The following players received wildcards into the singles main draw:
  Karol Beck 
  Jan Choinski 
  Jan Hájek   
  Miloslav Mečíř Jr.

The following player received a special exemption into the singles main draw:
  Benjamin Balleret

The following player received a protected ranking into the singles main draw:
  Steve Darcis

The following player entered into the singles main draw as an alternate:
  Jan Mertl

The following players received entry from the qualifying draw:
  Victor Crivoi 
  Dennis Novak
  Franko Škugor 
  Artem Smirnov

Champions

Singles

  Andreas Haider-Maurer def.  Antonio Veić, 2–6, 6–3, 7–6(7–4)

Doubles

 Roman Jebavý /  Jaroslav Pospíšil def.  Stephan Fransen /  Robin Haase, 6–4, 6–2

References

External links
Official Website

Trophy
Arimex Challenger Trophy
STRABAG Challenger Open